The Bosco Verticale (Vertical Forest) are two residential towers in the Porta Nuova district of Milan, region of Lombardy, Italy, between Via Gaetano de Castillia and Via Federico Confalonieri near Milano Porta Garibaldi railway station. Within the complex is an 11-storey office building; its facade does not include plants.

The towers were designed by Boeri Studio (Stefano Boeri, Gianandrea Barreca and Giovanni La Varra). It also involved input from horticulturalists and botanists.

The building was inaugurated in October 2014.

Concept

The project was designed as part of the rehabilitation of the historic district of Milan between Via De Castillia and Confalonieri in Porta Nuova, which is known to be one of the richest business district in Europe. Bosco Verticale is one of the biggest European redevelopment projects, consisting of two residential towers of which the largest is 26 floors and 110 metres high (called Torre E) and the smaller tower is 18 floors and 76 metres high (called Torre D). It contains 400 condominium units priced from 10,000 Euro per square meter for lower floors – to 18,000 Euro per square metre for higher floors. 

According to Stefano Boeri, the building was inspired by Italo Calvino's 1957 novel The Baron in the Trees, in which the protagonist decides to abandon the ground and live in the trees for the rest of his life. The project was named Bosco Verticale, or in English "Vertical Forest", because together the towers have 800 trees, 5,000 shrubs and 1.5000 perennial plants, which help mitigate smog and produce oxygen. These tree-packed high rises help cities built for density, adding more housing and infrastructure, while improving the air quality. Trees and plants are the most efficient and cost effective way to absorb carbon dioxide. The 20,000 trees and perennial plants in the buildings will convert approximately 44,000 pounds of carbon each year. With more than 90 species, the buildings' biodiversity is expected to attract new bird and insect species to the city. It is also used to moderate temperatures in the building in the winter and summer, by shading the interiors from the sun and blocking harsh winds. The vegetation also protects the interior spaces from noise pollution and dust from street-level traffic.  

The building itself is self-sufficient by using renewable energy from solar panels and filtered waste water to sustain the buildings' plant life. These green technology systems reduce the overall waste and carbon footprint of the towers. Lead designer Stefano Boeri stated, “It’s very important to completely change how these new cities are developing. Urban forestation is one of the biggest issues for me in that context. That means parks, it means gardens, but it also means having buildings with trees.” 

The design was tested in a wind tunnel to ensure the trees would not topple from gusts of wind. Botanists and horticulturalists were consulted by the engineering team to ensure that the structure could bear the load imposed by the plants. The steel-reinforced concrete balconies are designed to be 28 cm thick, with 1.30 metre parapets. Bosco Verticale is the first model of urban densification of nature in a city and Boeri plans to build similar structures in Switzerland, the Netherlands (one is already under construction in Eindhoven and soon also in Utrecht), and multiple cities in China.

Construction

The construction of the towers began in late 2009 and early 2010, involving 6,000 onsite construction workers. Between mid-2010 and early 2011 construction progressed very slowly and the towers rose by only five floors while the core rose to the seventh floor. Construction progressed throughout 2011, and by the beginning of 2012 the structures were completed, and construction of the facades and installation of the plants began on June 13, 2012. The building was inaugurated in October 2014.

On 11 April 2012, one of the buildings was used as a temporary art gallery and opened to the public for an art exhibition hosted during Milan Fashion Week.

The two buildings have 730 trees (480 large, 250 small), 5,000 shrubs, and 11,000 perennials and groundcover on its façades. The original design had specified 1,280 tall plants and 920 short plants encompassing 50 species. Overall, the vegetation is the equivalent of that found in a one hectare wood.  The innovative use of heat pump technology is helping to reduce heating and cooling costs.

Awards
On 19 November 2014, Bosco Verticale won the International Highrise Award, a prestigious international competition held every two years to honour excellence in recently constructed buildings that stand a minimum of 100 metres (328 feet) tall. The five finalists were selected from 26 nominees in 17 countries.

On 12 November 2015, the Council on Tall Buildings and Urban Habitat (CTBUH) Awards Jury selected Bosco Verticale as the overall “2015 Best Tall Building Worldwide” at the 14th Annual CTBUH International Best Tall Building Awards Symposium, Ceremony & Dinner, celebrated at the Illinois Institute of Technology, Chicago.

Notes

References

External links

Bosco Verticale at Stefano Boeri Architetti

Skyscrapers in Milan
Residential skyscrapers in Italy
2014 establishments in Italy
Residential buildings completed in 2014